The 1930 South Dakota Coyotes football team was an American football team that represented the University of South Dakota in the North Central Conference (NCC) during the 1930 college football season. In its fourth and final season under head coach Vincent E. Montgomery, the team compiled a 1–5–2 record (0–4 against NCC opponents), finished in fifth place out of five teams in the NCC, and was outscored opponents by a total of 144 to 118.  The team played its home games at Inman Field in Vermillion, South Dakota.

Schedule

References

South Dakota
South Dakota Coyotes football seasons
South Dakota Coyotes football